George Marlay was an Irish Anglican priest in the eighteenth century: he was Bishop of Dromore from 1745 until 1763. He gave his name to Marlay Park, which is now a popular amenity in south Dublin.

He was born at Creevagh Beg, near Ballymahon, County Longford, the younger son of Anthony Marlay and Elizabeth Morgan. His father was originally from Newcastle-upon-Tyne, and was a son of the English Civil War hero Sir John Marlay. His mother came from a long-established landowning family in County Sligo. Thomas Marlay, Lord Chief Justice of Ireland, was  his brother. Thomas was the father of Richard Marlay, Bishop of Waterford and the soldier Colonel Thomas Marlay, and grandfather of the noted statesman Henry Grattan.

Marlay was educated at Trinity College, Dublin. He was Prebendary of Raphoe and Rector of Louth.

He married Elizabeth Dunleavy and had two children, George and Elizabeth. George was an army officer, who fought in the American War of Independence, and was captured after the Battle of Saratoga. He married Lady Catherine Butler, younger daughter of Brinsley Butler, 2nd Earl of Lanesborough and Lady Jane  Rochfort, and lived mainly in London. Elizabeth married the leading banker David La Touche, who became the first Governor of the Bank of Ireland. David built an impressive house south of Dublin city, which he named Marlay House in honour of his wife's family. Today it is in public ownership and a popular amenity for  Dubliners and tourists alike.

Marlay died on 13 April 1763.

References

Christian clergy from Dublin (city)
1763 deaths
Alumni of Trinity College Dublin
Anglican bishops of Dromore